Castle in the Desert is a 1942 film featuring the Chinese detective Charlie Chan. It was the eleventh film to feature Sidney Toler as the title character, and the last made by 20th Century Fox.  The series continued with Toler, though under much reduced circumstances, at Monogram Pictures.

Plot 
Mrs. Manderley, an eccentric descendant of the Borgias lives in a castle in the middle of the Mojave Desert with her husband Paul Manderley, a reclusive scholarly millionaire.  Someone is killed after being poisoned. Paul tries to cover up the murder in which Charlie Chan investigates. In addition to Paul Manderley and his wife (who may be insane and not responsible for her actions) other suspects include:

Walter Hartford, Paul's lawyer who wants to maintain his influence over the Manderley estate
Madame Saturnia, a local astrologer who takes great pride in the fact that her predictions about the growing number of murder victims are always right
Watson King, a sculptor who warns Chan to mind his own business and has a connection to the Manderleys

The clues include:

the poison used which was stolen from a laboratory
a forged letter sent to Charlie Chan summoning him to the Manderley Castle
the poisoned cocktail
a medieval crossbow

Aiding and hindering Chan's investigation is his Number Two son Jimmy, who is on leave with the U.S. Army, and decides to get involved to help his father solve the case, much to the senior Chan's annoyance.

The location is loosely based on Scotty's Castle, a Spanish Revival style villa built by a Chicago millionaire as a vacation home in Death Valley.

Cast 
Sidney Toler as Charlie Chan
Arleen Whelan as Brenda Hartford
Richard Derr as Carl Detheridge
Douglass Dumbrille as Paul Manderley
Henry Daniell as Watson King
Edmund MacDonald as Walter Hartford
Victor Sen Yung as Jimmy Chan
 Lenita Lane as Lucrezia "Lucy" Manderley
Ethel Griffies as Lily, Mme. Saturnia
Steven Geray as Dr. Retling
Lucien Littlefield as Professor Gleason
Milton Parsons as Arthur Fletcher, Private Investigator

External links
 

1942 films
American black-and-white films
Charlie Chan films
20th Century Fox films
Films directed by Harry Lachman
1942 mystery films
American mystery films
Films set in deserts
1940s English-language films
1940s American films